Murphy McQuite Holloway (born April 24, 1990) is an American professional basketball player for the Goyang Orions of the Korean Basketball League. A power forward/center, he played college basketball for University of Mississippi before playing professionally in Turkey, Israel, Italy, France, the Philippines, South Korea, Bahrain, and Germany.

Early life and college career
Holloway attended Dutch Fork High School in Irmo, South Carolina, where he was named South Carolina Gatorade Player of the Year, 4A Player of the Year and Mr. Basketball as a senior. Holloway became the leading scorer in Dutch Fork history with 1,487 career points, he averaged 28 points, 15 rebounds and 4 blocks as a senior.

Holloway played four years of college basketball for the University of Mississippi, where he averaged 14.5 points, 9.7 rebounds and 1.6 steals per game as a senior. Holoway was named to the SEC All-Tournament Team and SEC All-Second Team.

Professional career
In September 2013, Holloway started his professional career with the Turkish team Büyükçekmece Basketbol. 

In December 2013, Holloway signed with the Israeli team Ironi Kiryat Ata for the 2014–15 season. However, he was released by the team due to injury. One month later, he signed with Hapoel Kfar Saba for the rest of the season.

On August 23, 2014, Holloway signed with the Italian team Pallacanestro Trieste for the 2014–15 season.

On July 4, 2015, Holloway signed with the French team Cholet Basket for the 2015–16 season.

On June 17, 2016, Holloway returned to Israel for a second stint, signing a one-year deal with Hapoel Gilboa Galil. Holloway led the league in efficiency rating (20.5 per game) and was the second-leading rebounder with 9.9 per game.

On July 22, 2017, Holloway signed with the Philippine team GlobalPort Batang Pierfor the rest of the 2016–17 PBA season, joining as a replacement for Jabril Trawick. On July 30, 2017, Holloway recorded a career-high 36 points, shooting 17-of-30 from the field, along with 18 rebounds in a 108–124 loss to the Barangay Ginebra Kings.

On September 27, 2017, Holloway returned to Israel for a third stint, signing with Maccabi Rishon LeZion for the 2017–18 season. On February 18, 2018, Holloway recorded a season-high 28 points, shooting 12-of-14 from the field, along with 13 rebounds, 5 steals and 3 assists in a 97–102 loss to the Hapoel Holon. During the season, Holloway was named two-time MVP of the Round. Holloway finished the season as the league fourth-leading rebounder with 8.5 per game and fourth in efficiency rating with 20.1 per game. 

On August 7, 2018, Holloway signed with the Incheon ET Land Elephants of the Korean Basketball League. In 17 games played for the Elephants, he averaged 18.1 points, 13 rebounds and 1.9 blocks.

On July 7, 2019, Holloway re-signed with the Incheon ET Land Elephants for the 2019–20 season.

On November 25, 2020, Holloway signed with Al-Muharraq SC.

On February 9, 2021, Holloway signed with s.Oliver Würzburg for the rest of the 2020–21 season. He averaged 11.1 points, 4.9 rebounds, 1.5 assists and 1.4 steals per game. On August 20, 2021, Holloway signed with the Goyang Orions of the Korean Basketball League.

The Basketball Tournament
In 2017, Holloway played for Ole Hotty Toddy, a team of Ole Miss alumni, in The Basketball Tournament. Holloway's team was upset in the first round by Team NC Prodigal Sons. The Basketball Tournament is an annual $2 million winner-take-all tournament broadcast on ESPN.

In TBT 2018, Holloway suited up for Armored Athlete. In 3 games, he averaged 8.3 points, 9 rebounds, and shot 67 percent from the field. Armored Athlete reached the Super 16 before falling to Boeheim's Army.

Career statistics

Domestic Leagues

|-
| style="text-align:center;" | 2014–15
| style="text-align:left;" rowspan=1| Pallacanestro Trieste
| style="text-align:center;" rowspan=1| Serie A2
|| 37 || 30.8 || .507 || .208 || .533 || 8.1 || 1.5 || 1.5 || 1.3 || 17.1
|-
| style="text-align:center;" | 2015–16
| style="text-align:left;" rowspan=1| Cholet
| style="text-align:center;" rowspan=1| Pro A
|| 31 || 25.8 || .582 || .273 || .585 || 6.7 || 1.2 || 1.1 || .5 || 13.1
|-
| style="text-align:center;" | 2016–17
| style="text-align:left;" rowspan=1| Hapoel Gilboa Galil
| style="text-align:center;" rowspan=1| IPL
|| 24 || 30.0 || .545 || .111 || .593 || 9.9 || 2.1 || 1.4 || .8 || 15.9
|-
| style="text-align:center;" | 2017
| style="text-align:left;" rowspan=1| GlobalPort Batang Pier
| style="text-align:center;" rowspan=1| PBA
|| 8 || 42.2 || .532 || .316 || .519 || 17.7 || 3.6 || 2.8 || 2.7 || 27.0
|-
| style="text-align:center;" | 2017–18
| style="text-align:left;" rowspan=1| Maccabi Rishon LeZion
| style="text-align:center;" rowspan=1| IPL
|| 33 || 29.1 || .592 || .0 || .607 || 8.5 || 2.3 || 1.4 || .7 || 13.5
|-
| style="text-align:center;" | 2018–19
| style="text-align:left;" rowspan=1| Incheon ET Land Elephants
| style="text-align:center;" rowspan=1| KBL
|| 17 || 31.9 || .568 || .0 || .432 || 13.0 || 3.0 || 1.7 || 1.9 || 18.1
|-
|}
Source: RealGM

References

External links
 RealGM profile

1990 births
Living people
American expatriate basketball people in France
American expatriate basketball people in Israel
American expatriate basketball people in Italy
American expatriate basketball people in the Philippines
American expatriate basketball people in South Korea
American expatriate basketball people in Turkey
American men's basketball players
Basketball players from South Carolina
Büyükçekmece Basketbol players
Centers (basketball)
Cholet Basket players
NorthPort Batang Pier players
Hapoel Gilboa Galil Elyon players
Hapoel Kfar Saba B.C. players
Daegu KOGAS Pegasus players
Ironi Kiryat Ata players
Maccabi Rishon LeZion basketball players
Ole Miss Rebels men's basketball players
Pallacanestro Trieste players
People from Irmo, South Carolina
Philippine Basketball Association imports
Power forwards (basketball)